A Ride for Cinderella is a 1937 Technicolor cartoon sponsored film, and is a sequel to A Coach for Cinderella. The storyline is simple: Cinderella meets her young prince, but has to leave him when the clock turns to midnight. Meanwhile, the head dwarf, Nicky Nome, has to stop the wicked witch, hired by the evil stepsisters, from ruining Cinderella's chance of marrying the prince. The cartoon is an advertisement for Chevrolet, and a Chevrolet that helps Cinderella get her prince. The cartoon was made the Jam Handy Organization, famous for their advertising films. It is in the public domain.

See also
Chevrolet
Jam Handy
Fairy tales
Advertising
Sponsored film
A Coach for Cinderella
Peg-Leg Pedro
The Princess and the Pauper

External links
 

Vimeo

References

American animated short films
Chevrolet
Films based on Cinderella
1937 films
Sponsored films
Jam Handy Organization films
Articles containing video clips
1937 animated films
Promotional films
1930s English-language films
1930s American films